The Paka is a 40 km (25 mi) long river in Slovenia. It flows through Velenje and it joins the Savinja as a left tributary.

See also 
List of rivers of Slovenia

References

External links
 
 Condition of Paka - graphs, in the following order, of water level, flow and temperature data for the past 30 days (taken in Šoštanj by ARSO)

Rivers of Styria (Slovenia)